Anklav is a city and a municipality in Anand district  in the state of Gujarat, India.

Demographics
 India census, Anklav had a population of 19,805. Males constitute 53% of the population and females 47%. Anklav has an average literacy rate of 62%, higher than the national average of 59.5%; with 60% of the males and 40% of females literate. 14% of the population is under 6 years of age.

Other information
Anklav is situated on Vadodara–Kathana broad gauge railway line. It is a taluka place having Taluka Govt. Offices like Taluka Panchayat, Mamlatdar Office, Taluka Health Office. Community Health center is running 24 hours to provide Primary & Emergency Health services.
Anklav Town is mainly divided in 2 major parts, 1. Compact Town area (60% population) & 2. peripheral field area (40% Population). Compact town area is divided in streets like Bahila ni Khadki, Shirvi ni Khadki, Undi khadki, Shakkar das ni khadaki, Moti khadaki, Vanto, Valasaniya Khadki, Ambalipura, Brahmpol & many more.

Anklav is member of 24 Gam and 17 Gam leuva patidar samaj.

References

Cities and towns in Anand district